Pepingen is a municipality located in the Belgian province of Flemish Brabant. The municipality comprises the villages of Beert, Bellingen, Bogaarden, Elingen, Heikruis and Pepingen proper. It is also situated in the Pajottenland. On January 1, 2006, Pepingen had a total population of 4,352. The total area is 36.05 km² which gives a population density of 121 inhabitants per km².

References

External links
 
 Official Pepingen website

Municipalities of Flemish Brabant